Nice Place to Visit is the second album by Frōzen Ghōst.

Track listing
All songs written by Arnold Lanni.
"Better to Try" - 4:42
"Pauper in Paradise" - 4:45
"Selling Salvation" - 4:57
"Step by Step"* - 3:50
"Mother Nature" - 3:48
"Echo a Miracle" - 4:30
"Round and Round" - 4:22
"Dream Come True" - 4:19
"Perfect World" - 4:25
"Suspended Humanation" - 5:05

(*used in the 1989 American television production of Bionic Showdown: The Six Million Dollar Man and the Bionic Woman.)

Album credits

Personnel
Arnold Lanni - lead vocals, acoustic and electric guitars, keyboards, programming
Wolf Hassel - bass and vocals
with:
Phil X - additional guitar
John Gargano - additional guitar
Phil Poppa, Tony Carlucci, Mike Massaro, Doug Gibson, Serge Molella, Tony Moretta - additional background vocals

Production
Arnold Lanni - producer
Michael Sarracini - engineer
Mixed at the Farmyard Studios, Bucks, England by Stephen W. Tayler
Mastering - George Marino at Sterling Sound, NYC

References

1988 albums
Atlantic Records albums
Albums produced by Arnold Lanni
Frozen Ghost albums